This List of cannabis-related lists gives an index to different lists of articles related to cannabis. The lists are organized by legal topics, organizations, the hemp plant, popular culture and country.
See :Category:Cannabis for a complete set of articles related to cannabis.

Legal

Arguments for and against drug prohibition
List of cannabis seizures
Minors and the legality of cannabis
Timeline of cannabis law

Organizations

Cannabis political parties
List of addiction and substance abuse organizations
List of anti-cannabis organizations
List of cannabis companies
List of cannabis rights leaders
List of cannabis rights organizations

Hemp

List of cannabis seed companies
List of hemp diseases
List of hemp products
List of hemp varieties

Popular culture

Counterculture Hall of Fame
Glossary of cannabis terms
List of books about cannabis
List of cannabis columns
List of cannabis competitions
List of drug films
List of films containing frequent marijuana use
List of names for cannabis
List of names for cannabis strains
List of psychedelic drugs
List of rolling papers
List of slang names for cannabis

By country

Adult lifetime cannabis use by country
Annual cannabis use by country
Legality of cannabis by country

Canada

List of Canadian cannabis regulatory agencies
List of licensed producers of medical marijuana in Canada

United Kingdom

Drugs controlled by the UK Misuse of Drugs Act
List of British politicians who have acknowledged cannabis use

United States

Cannabis dispensaries in the United States
Legality of cannabis by U.S. jurisdiction
List of 2016 United States cannabis reform proposals
List of 2017 United States cannabis reform proposals
List of 2018 United States cannabis reform proposals
List of 2019 United States cannabis reform proposals
List of 2020 United States cannabis reform proposals
List of Schedule I drugs (US)
List of United States cannabis regulatory agencies
List of United States politicians who have acknowledged cannabis use

See also